The Rwanda National Olympic and Sports Committee (IOC code: RWA) is the National Olympic Committee representing Rwanda.

See also
Rwanda at the Olympics
Rwanda at the Commonwealth Games

References

Rwanda
Rwanda at the Olympics